Screenshop was a British strand of infomercial-based shopping programming and television channel, owned by Sit-up Ltd. Screenshop sold a wide variety of products from TV Warehouse.

Channels

Screenshop 1
In 2004, Screenshop 1 began to be run for Sit-Up by Vector Direct. Vector broadcast their presentations exclusively on the channel, and eventually this led to the channel being stripped of its own identity. In 2005, it began to broadcast under Vector Direct's own 'TV Warehouse' brand (as TV Warehouse 1). This may be due to Vector Direct's appearance on the BBC's Watchdog programme, which was due to the company charging unknowing customers £99.00 for entrance into a "Travel and Leisure" club, in which entry was automatic with every purchase. It is expected that Vector Direct do not use their own brand because of this bad publicity, however this has not been confirmed. Vector Direct went into voluntary liquidation just before Christmas in 2007, TV Warehouse was purchased by JML but closed in 2009.

Screenshop 2
On 3 March 2008, a Screenshop branded channel "Screenshop 2" launched exclusively on Sky channel 680, using the downtime of Speed Auction. The channel showed items from Vector Direct between 1.30am to 7.30am every night. Screenshop 2 closed on 29 April 2012.

Screenshop strand
Screenshop broadcast a strand during the night (until 7am) on UK Gold and also during the day on the Discovery channel feed on Sky in the late 90s. It also initially broadcast 24 hours a day on empty channel space on an Astra satellite, though this was short lived. In the 2000s, Screenshop broadcast daily from 1.30am to 7.45am, on sister channels Bid and Price Drop. Each of these channels carried a different feed of Screenshop, broadcasting different products at different times. The arrangement ended when Sit-Up went into administration in the early 2010s. Screenshop also broadcast from 2004 to 2009 as the teleshopping block on Capital One.

See also
TV Warehouse

External links

Bid Shopping
Defunct television channels in the United Kingdom
Television channels and stations disestablished in 2012
Television channels and stations established in 1997